The Bell P-39 Airacobra is a fighter produced by Bell Aircraft for the United States Army Air Forces during World War II. It was one of the principal American fighters in service when the United States entered combat. The P-39 was used by the Soviet Air Force, and enabled individual Soviet pilots to collect the highest number of kills attributed to any U.S. fighter type flown by any air force in any conflict. Other major users of the type included the Free French, the Royal Air Force, and the Italian Co-Belligerent Air Force.

It had an unusual layout, with the engine installed in the center fuselage, behind the pilot, and driving a tractor propeller in the nose with a long shaft. It was also the first fighter fitted with a tricycle undercarriage.  Although its mid-engine placement was innovative, the P-39 design was handicapped by the absence of an efficient turbo-supercharger, preventing it from performing high-altitude work. For this reason it was rejected by the RAF for use over western Europe but adopted by the USSR, where most air combat took place at medium and lower altitudes.

Together with the derivative P-63 Kingcobra, the P-39 was one of the most successful fixed-wing aircraft manufactured by Bell.

Design and development

Circular Proposal X-609

In February 1937, Lieutenant Benjamin S. Kelsey, Project Officer for Fighters at the United States Army Air Corps (USAAC), and Captain Gordon P. Saville, fighter tactics instructor at the Air Corps Tactical School, issued a specification for a new fighter via Circular Proposal X-609. It was a request for a single-engine high-altitude "interceptor" having "the tactical mission of interception and attack of hostile aircraft at high altitude". Despite being called an interceptor, the proposed aircraft's role was simply an extension of the traditional pursuit (fighter) role, using a heavier and more powerful aircraft at higher altitude. Specifications called for at least  of heavy armament including a cannon, a liquid-cooled Allison engine with a General Electric turbo-supercharger, tricycle landing gear, a level airspeed of at least  at altitude, and a climb to  within 6 minutes. This was the most demanding set of fighter specifications USAAC had presented to that date. Although Bell's limited fighter design work had previously resulted in the unusual Bell YFM-1 Airacuda, the Model 12 proposal adopted an equally original configuration with an Allison V-12 engine mounted in the middle of the fuselage, just behind the cockpit, and a propeller driven by a shaft passing beneath the pilot's feet under the cockpit floor.

The main purpose of this configuration was to free up space for a 37 mm Browning Arms Company T9 cannon, later produced by Oldsmobile, firing through the center of the propeller hub for optimum accuracy and stability. This happened because H.M. Poyer, designer for project leader Robert Woods, was impressed by the power of this weapon and pressed for its incorporation. This was unusual, because fighter design had previously been driven by the intended engine, not the weapon system. Although devastating when it worked, the T9 had very limited ammunition, a low rate of fire, and was prone to jamming.

A secondary benefit of the mid-engine arrangement was that it created a smooth and streamlined nose profile. Much was made of the fact that this resulted in a configuration "with as trim and clean a fuselage nose as the snout of a high velocity bullet". Entry to the cockpit was through side doors (mounted on both sides of the cockpit) rather than a sliding canopy. Its unusual engine location and the long drive shaft caused some concern to pilots at first, but experience showed this was no more of a hazard in a crash landing than with an engine located forward of the cockpit. There were no problems with propeller shaft failure.

XP-39 developments
However, the XP-39 was found to be short on performance at altitude.

As originally specified by Kelsey and Saville, the XP-39 had a turbo-supercharger to augment its high-altitude performance. Bell cooled the turbo with a scoop on the left side of the fuselage. Kelsey wished to shepherd the XP-39 through its early engineering teething troubles, but he was ordered to England. The XP-39 project was handed over to others, and in June 1939 the prototype was ordered by General Henry H. Arnold to be evaluated in NACA wind tunnels to find ways of increasing its speed, by reducing parasitic drag. Tests were carried out, and Bell engineers followed the recommendations of NACA and the Army to reduce drag such that the top speed was increased 16%. NACA wrote, "it is imperative to enclose the supercharger within the airplane with an efficient duct system for cooling the rotor and discharging the cooling air and exhaust gases." In the very tightly planned XP-39, though, there was no internal space left over for the turbo. Using a drag-buildup scheme, a number of potential areas of drag reduction were found. NACA concluded that a top speed of  could be realized with the aerodynamic improvements they had developed and an uprated V-1710 with only a single-stage, single-speed supercharger.

At a pivotal meeting with the USAAC and NACA in August 1939, Larry Bell proposed that the production P-39 aircraft be configured without the turbocharger. Some historians have questioned Bell's true motivation in reconfiguring the aircraft. The strongest hypothesis is that Bell's factory did not have an active production program and he was desperate for cash flow. Other historians mention that wind tunnel tests made the designers believe the turbocharger installation was so aerodynamically cluttered that it had more disadvantages than advantages.

The Army ordered 12 YP-39s (with only a single-stage, single-speed supercharger) for service evaluation and one YP-39A. After these trials were complete, which resulted in detail changes including deletion of the external radiator, and on advice from NACA, the prototype was modified as the XP-39B; after demonstrating a performance improvement, the 13 YP-39s were completed to this standard, adding two  machine guns to the two existing  guns. Lacking armor or self-sealing fuel tanks, the prototype was  lighter than the production fighters.

As a result, the aircraft was simpler to produce and maintain. However, the removal of the turbo destroyed any chance that the P-39 could serve as a high-altitude front-line fighter. When deficiencies were noticed in 1940 and 1941, the lack of a turbo made it nearly impossible to improve upon the Airacobra's performance. The removal of the turbocharger and its drag-inducing inlet cured the drag problem but reduced performance overall. In later years, Kelsey expressed regret at not being present to override the decision to eliminate the turbo.

After completing service trials, and originally designated P-45, a first order for 80 aircraft was placed 10 August 1939; the designation reverted to P-39C before deliveries began. After assessing aerial combat conditions in Europe, it was evident that without armor or self-sealing tanks, the 20 production P-39Cs were not suitable for operational use. The remaining 60 machines in the order were built as P-39Ds with armor, self-sealing tanks and enhanced armament. These P-39Ds were the first Airacobras to enter into service with the Army Air Corps units and would be the first ones to see action.

Technical details

The P-39 was an all-metal, low-wing, single-engine fighter, with a tricycle undercarriage and an Allison V-1710 liquid-cooled V-12 engine mounted in the central fuselage, directly behind the cockpit.

The Airacobra was one of the first production fighters to be conceived as a "weapons system"; in this case the aircraft (known originally as the Bell Model 4) was designed to provide a platform for the 37 mm T9 cannon. The 90-inch-long (2.3 m), 200 lb (90 kg) weapon had to be rigidly mounted and fire parallel to and close to the centerline of the new fighter. It would have been impossible to mount the weapon in the fuselage, firing through the cylinder banks of the Vee-configured engine and the propeller hub as could be done with smaller 20 mm cannon. Weight, balance and visibility considerations meant that the cockpit could not be placed farther back in the fuselage, behind the engine and cannon. The solution adopted was to mount the cannon in the forward fuselage and the engine in the center fuselage, directly behind the pilot's seat. The tractor propeller was driven with a  drive shaft made in two sections, incorporating a self-aligning bearing to accommodate fuselage deflection during violent maneuvers. This shaft ran through a tunnel in the cockpit floor and was connected to a gearbox in the nose of the fuselage which, in turn, drove the three- or (later) four-bladed propeller by way of a short central shaft. The gearbox was provided with its own lubrication system, separate from the engine; in later versions of the Airacobra the gearbox was provided with some armor protection. The glycol-cooled radiator was fitted in the wing center section, immediately beneath the engine; this was flanked on either side by a single drum-shaped oil cooler. Air for the radiator and oil coolers was drawn in through intakes in both wing-root leading edges and was directed via four ducts to the radiator faces. The air was then exhausted through three controllable hinged flaps near the trailing edge of the center section. Air for the carburetor was drawn in through a raised oval intake immediately aft of the rear canopy.

The fuselage structure was unusual and innovative, being based on a strong central keel that incorporated the armament, cockpit, and engine. Two strong fuselage beams to port and starboard formed the basis of the structure. These angled upwards fore and aft to create mounting points for the T9 cannon and propeller reduction gearbox and for the engine and accessories respectively. A strong arched bulkhead provided the main structural attachment point for the main spar of the wing. This arch incorporated a fireproof panel and an armor plate between the engine and the cockpit. It also incorporated a turnover pylon and a pane of bullet-resistant glass behind the pilot's head. The arch also formed the basis of the cockpit housing; the pilot's seat was attached to the forward face as was the cockpit floor. Forward of the cockpit the fuselage nose was formed from large removable covers. A long nose wheel well was incorporated in the lower nose section. The engine and accessories were attached to the rear of the arch and the main structural beams; these too were covered using large removable panels. A conventional semi-monocoque rear fuselage was attached aft of the main structure.

Because the pilot was above the extension shaft, he was placed higher in the fuselage than in most contemporary fighters, which, in turn gave the pilot a good field of view. Access to the cockpit was by way of sideways opening "car doors", one on either side. Both had wind-down windows. As only the right-hand door had a handle both inside and outside this was used as the normal means of access and egress. The left-hand door could be opened only from the outside and was for emergency use, although both doors could be jettisoned. In operational use, as the roof was fixed, the cockpit design made escape difficult in an emergency.

The complete armament fit consisted of the T9 cannon with a pair of Browning M2  machine guns mounted in the nose. This changed to two .50 caliber and two  guns in the XP-39B (P-39C, Model 13, the first 20 delivered) and two .50s and four .30s (all four in the wings) in the P-39D (Model 15), which also introduced self-sealing tanks and shackles (and piping) for a  bomb or drop tank.

Because of the unconventional layout, there was no space in the fuselage to place a fuel tank. Although drop tanks were implemented to extend its range, the standard fuel load was carried in the wings, with the result that the P-39 was limited to short-range tactical strikes.

Weight distribution could result in it entering a dangerous flat spin, a characteristic Soviet test pilots demonstrated to the skeptical manufacturer, which had been unable to reproduce the effect. It was determined the spin could only be induced if the aircraft was flown with no ammunition in the nose. The flight manual noted a need to ballast the front ammunition compartment to achieve a reasonable center of gravity. High-speed controls were light, consequently high-speed turns and pull-outs were possible.

Soon after entering service, pilots began to report that "during flights of the P-39 in certain maneuvers, it tumbled end over end." Most of these events happened after the aircraft was stalled in a nose high attitude with considerable power applied. Bell pilots made 86 separate efforts to reproduce the reported tumbling characteristics. In no case were they able to tumble it. In his autobiography veteran test and airshow pilot R.A. "Bob" Hoover provides an account of tumbling a P-39. He goes on to say that in hindsight, he was actually performing a Lomcovak, a now-common airshow maneuver, which he was also able to do in a Curtiss P-40.   A study of its spinning characteristics was conducted in the NASA Langley Research Center  Free-Spinning Tunnel during the 1970s. A study of old reports showed that during earlier tests the aircraft never tumbled. However, it was noted that all testing had been done with a simulated full ammunition load, which moved the center of gravity forward. After finding the original spin test model of the P-39 in storage, the new study first duplicated the earlier tests, with consistent results. Then, the model was re-ballasted to simulate a condition with no ammunition load, which moved the aircraft's center of gravity aft. Under these conditions, the model was found to tumble.

The rear-mounted engine was less likely to be hit when attacking ground targets, but was vulnerable to attacks from above and behind. At its upper altitude limits, the Airacobra was out-performed by many enemy aircraft.

Service and versions 
In September 1940, Britain ordered 386 P-39Ds (Model 14), with a 20 mm Hispano-Suiza HS.404 and six  instead of a 37 mm cannon and six .30 caliber guns. The RAF eventually ordered 675 P-39s. However, after the first Airacobras arrived at 601 Squadron RAF in September 1941, they were found to have an inadequate rate of climb and performance at altitude for Western European conditions. Only 80 were operated, all by 601 Squadron. Britain transferred about 200 P-39s to the Soviet Union.

Another 200 examples intended for the RAF were taken up by the USAAF after the attack on Pearl Harbor as the P-400, and were sent to the Fifth Air Force in Australia, for service in the South West Pacific Theatre.

By the date of the Pearl Harbor attack, nearly 600 P-39s had been built. When P-39 production ended in August 1944, Bell had built 9,558 Airacobras, of which 4,773 (mostly −39N and −39Q) were sent to the Soviet Union through the Lend-Lease program. There were numerous minor variations in engine, propeller, and armament, but no major structural changes in production types, excepting a few two-seat TP-39F and RP-39Q trainers. In addition, seven went to the U.S. Navy as radio-controlled drones.

Trials of a laminar flow wing (in the XP-39E) and Continental IV-1430 engine (the P-76) were unsuccessful. The mid-engine, gun-through-hub concept was developed further in the Bell P-63 Kingcobra.

A naval version with tailwheel landing gear, the XFL-1 Airabonita, was ordered as a competitor to the Vought F4U Corsair and Grumman XF5F Skyrocket. It first flew 13 May 1940, but after a troublesome and protracted development and testing period, it was rejected.

Operational history
The Airacobra saw combat throughout the world, particularly in the Southwest Pacific, Mediterranean and Soviet theaters. Because its engine was equipped with only a single-stage, single-speed supercharger, the P-39 performed poorly above  altitude. In both western Europe and the Pacific, the Airacobra found itself outclassed as an interceptor and the type was gradually relegated to other duties. It often was used at lower altitudes for such missions as ground strafing.

United Kingdom
In 1940, the British Direct Purchase Commission in the U.S. was looking for combat aircraft; they ordered 675 of the export version Bell Model 14 as the "Caribou" on the strength of the company's representations on 13 April 1940. The British armament was two nose-mounted .50 caliber machine guns and four .303 caliber Browning machine guns in the wings. The 37 mm gun was replaced by a 20 mm Hispano-Suiza cannon.

British expectations had been set by performance figures established by the unarmed and unarmored XP-39 prototype. The British production contract stated that a maximum speed of  +/- 4% was required at rated altitude. To enable the aircraft to make the guarantee speed, a variety of drag-reduction modifications were developed by Bell. The areas of the elevator and rudder were reduced by 14.2% and 25.2% respectively. Modified fillets were installed in the tail area. The canopy glass was faired to its frame with putty. The gun access doors on the wing had been seen to bulge in flight, so they were replaced with thicker aluminum sheet. Similarly, the landing gear doors deflected open by as much as two inches at maximum speed, so a stronger linkage was installed to hold them flush. The cooling air exit from the oil and coolant radiators was reduced in area to match the exit velocity to the local flow. New engine exhaust stacks, deflected to match the local flow and with nozzles to increase thrust augmentation, were installed. The machine gun ports were faired over, the antenna mast was removed, a single-piece engine cowling was installed and an exhaust stack fairing was added.

The airframe was painted with 20 coats of primer, with extensive sanding between coats. Standard camouflage was applied and sanded to remove the edges between the colors. As this speed was within 1% of the guarantee, the aircraft was declared to have satisfied contractual obligations. Despite the success of these modifications, none were applied to other production P-39s. Later testing of a standard production P-400 by the British Aeroplane and Armament Experimental Establishment (A&AEE) revealed a top speed of only .

The British export models were renamed "Airacobra" in 1941. A further 150 were specified for delivery under Lend-Lease in 1941 but these were not supplied. The Royal Air Force (RAF) took delivery in mid-1941 and found that performance of the non-turbo-supercharged production aircraft differed markedly from what they were expecting. In some areas, the Airacobra was inferior to existing aircraft such as the Hawker Hurricane and Supermarine Spitfire and its performance at altitude suffered drastically. The cockpit layout was criticized, and it was noted that the pilot would have difficulty in bailing out in an emergency because the cockpit roof could not be jettisoned. The lack of a clear vision panel on the windscreen assembly meant that in the event of heavy rain the pilot's forward view would be obliterated; the pilot's notes advised that in this case the door windows would have to be lowered and the speed reduced to  On the other hand, it was considered effective for low level fighter and ground attack work. Problems with gun- and exhaust-flash suppression and the compass could be fixed.

No. 601 Squadron RAF was the only British unit to use the Airacobra operationally, receiving their first two examples on 6 August 1941. On 9 October, four Airacobras attacked enemy barges near Dunkirk, in the type's only operational action with the RAF. The squadron continued to train with the Airacobra during the winter, but a combination of poor serviceability and deep distrust of this unfamiliar fighter resulted in the RAF rejecting the type after one combat mission. In March 1942, the unit re-equipped with Spitfires.

U.S. Army Air Forces

Pacific

The United States requisitioned 200 of the aircraft being manufactured for the UK, adopting them as P-400s (named for the advertised top speed of ). After the attack on Pearl Harbor, the P-400 was deployed to training units, but some saw combat in the Southwest Pacific including with the Cactus Air Force in the Battle of Guadalcanal. Though outclassed by Japanese fighter aircraft, it performed well in strafing and bombing runs, often proving deadly in ground attacks on Japanese forces trying to retake Henderson Field. Guns salvaged from P-39s were sometimes fitted to Navy PT boats to increase firepower. Pacific pilots often complained about problems of performance and unreliable armament, but by the end of 1942, the P-39 units of the Fifth Air Force had claimed about 80 Japanese aircraft, with a similar number of P-39s lost. Fifth and Thirteenth Air Force P-39s did not score more aerial victories in the Solomons due to the aircraft's limited range and poor high altitude performance.

Airacobras first fought Japanese Zeros on 30 April 1942 in a low level action near Lae, New Guinea. From May to August 1942 combat between Airacobras and Zeros took place on a regular basis over New Guinea.  Compilation of combat reports indicates the Zero was either equal to or close to the P-39 in speed at the altitudes of the various low level encounters.

From September to November 1942 pilots of the 57th Fighter Squadron flew P-39s and P-38s from an airfield built on land bulldozed into Kuluk Bay on the barren island of Adak in Alaska's Aleutian Islands. They attacked the Japanese forces that had invaded Attu and Kiska islands in the Aleutians in June 1942. The factor that claimed the most lives was not the Japanese but the weather. The low clouds, heavy mist and fog, driving rain, snow, and high winds made flying dangerous and lives miserable. The 57th remained in Alaska until November 1942, then returned to the United States.

While Lt. Bill Fiedler was the only American pilot to become an ace in a P-39, many later U.S. aces scored one or two of their victories in the type. The Airacobra's low-altitude performance was good and its firepower was impressive; regardless, it soon became a joke in the Pacific Theatre that a P-400 was a P-40 with a Zero on its tail.

Mediterranean
In North Africa, the 99th Fighter Squadron (also known as the Tuskegee Airmen) transitioned quickly from the P-40 and were assigned P-39s in February 1944, but only flew the type for a few weeks.  The 99th carried out their duties including supporting Operation Shingle over Anzio as well as missions over the Gulf of Naples in the Airacobra but achieved few aerial victories.

The major MTO P-39 operators included the 81st and 350th Fighter Groups, both flying the maritime patrol mission from North Africa and on through Italy. The 81st transferred to the China Burma India Theater by March 1944 and the 350th began transition to the P-47D in August 1944, remaining in Italy with the 12th Air Force.

Soviet Union

The most successful and numerous use of the P-39 was by the Soviet Air Forces. They received the considerably improved N and Q models via the Alaska-Siberia ferry route. The tactical environment of the Eastern Front did not demand the high-altitude performance the RAF and AAF did. The comparatively low-speed, low-altitude nature of most air combat on the Eastern Front suited the P-39's strengths: sturdy construction, reliable radio gear, and adequate firepower.

Soviet pilots appreciated the cannon-armed P-39 primarily for its air-to-air capability. A common Western misconception is that the Bell fighters were used as ground attack aircraft. This is because the Soviet term for the mission of the P-39, prikrytiye sukhoputnykh voysk (coverage of ground forces) is commonly translated ground support, but is often taken to mean close air support. In Soviet usage, it has a broader meaning. Soviet-operated P-39s did make strafing attacks, but it was "never a primary mission or strong suit for this aircraft". The Soviets developed successful group aerial fighting tactics for the Bell fighters and scored a surprising number of aerial victories over a variety of German aircraft. Soviet P-39s had no trouble dispatching Junkers Ju 87 Stukas or German twin-engine bombers and matched, and in some areas surpassed, early and mid-war Messerschmitt Bf 109s. The usual nickname for the Airacobra in the VVS was Kobrushka ("little cobra") or Kobrastochka, a blend of Kobra and Lastochka (swallow), "dear little cobra".

The first Soviet Cobras had a 20 mm Hispano-Suiza cannon and two heavy Browning machine guns, synchronized and mounted in the nose. Later, Cobras arrived with the M4 37 mm cannon and four machine guns, two synchronized and two wing-mounted. "We immediately removed the wing machine guns, leaving one cannon and two machine guns," Golodnikov recalled later. That modification improved roll rate by reducing rotational inertia. Soviet airmen appreciated the M4 cannon with its powerful rounds and the reliable action but complained about the low rate of fire (three rounds per second) and inadequate ammunition storage (only 30 rounds).

The Soviets used the Airacobra primarily for air-to-air combat against a variety of German aircraft, including Bf 109s, Focke-Wulf Fw 190s, Ju 87s, and Ju 88s. During the battle of Kuban River, VVS relied on P-39s much more than Spitfires and P-40s. Aleksandr Pokryshkin, from 16.Gv.IAP (16th Guards Fighter Aviation Regiment), claimed 20 victories in that campaign in a P-39.

The last plane shot down by the Luftwaffe was a Soviet P-39, on May 8 by  Oblt. Fritz Stehle  of 2./JG 7  flying a Me 262 over the  Erzgebirge mountains.
Also, the last Soviet air victory was in a P-39 on May 9 when Kapitan Vasily Pshenichikov scored against a Focke-Wulf Fw 189 over Prague.
Five of the 10 highest scoring Soviet aces logged the majority of their kills in P-39s. Grigoriy Rechkalov scored 44 victories in Airacobras. Pokryshkin scored 47 of his 59 victories in P-39s, making him the highest scoring P-39 fighter pilot of any nation, and the highest scoring Allied fighter pilot using an American fighter.

The United States did not supply M80 armor-piercing rounds for the autocannons of Soviet P-39s—instead, the Soviets received 1,232,991 M54 high-explosive rounds, which they used primarily for air-to-air combat and against soft ground targets. The VVS did not use the P-39 for tank-busting duties.

A total of 4,719 P-39s were sent to the Soviet Union, accounting for more than one-third of all U.S. and UK-supplied fighter aircraft in the VVS, and nearly half of all P-39 production. Soviet Airacobra losses totalled 1,030 aircraft (49 in 1942, 305 in 1943, 486 in 1944 and 190 in 1945).

Airacobras served with the Soviet Air Forces as late as 1949, when two regiments were operating as part of the 16th Guards Fighter Aviation Division in the Belomorsky Military District.

Australia

A total of 23 re-conditioned Airacobras, on loan from the U.S. Fifth Air Force (5 AF), were used by the Royal Australian Air Force (RAAF) as a stop-gap interceptor in rear areas. The aircraft were assigned the RAAF serial prefix A53.

In the early months of the Pacific War, the RAAF was able to obtain only enough Curtiss Kittyhawks to equip three squadrons, destined for front-line duties in New Guinea. and – in the face of increasing Japanese air raids on towns in northern Australia – was forced to rely on the P-40, P-39, and P-400 units of 5 AF for the defence of areas such as Darwin. During mid-1942, USAAF P-39 units in Australia and New Guinea began to receive brand new P-39Ds. Consequently, P-39s that had been repaired in Australian workshops were loaned by 5 AF to the RAAF. In July, seven P-39Fs arrived at 24 Squadron, in RAAF Bankstown in Sydney. In August, seven P-39Ds were received by No. 23 Squadron RAAF at Lowood Airfield, near Brisbane. Both squadrons also operated other types, such as the CAC Wirraway armed trainer. Neither squadron received a full complement of Airacobras or saw combat with them. From early 1943, the air defence role was filled by a wing of Spitfires.

Both 23 and 24 Squadron converted to the Vultee Vengeance dive bomber in mid-1943, their P-39s transferred to two newly formed fighter squadrons: No. 82 (augmenting P-40s, still in short supply) at Bankstown and No. 83 (as it awaited the Australian-designed CAC Boomerang) in Strathpine, near Brisbane. After serving with these squadrons for a few months, the remaining Airacobras were returned to the USAAF and the RAAF ceased to operate the type.

France
In 1940, France ordered P-39s from Bell, but because of the armistice with Germany they were not delivered. After Operation Torch, French forces in North Africa sided with the Allies, and were re-equipped with Allied equipment including P-39Ns. From mid-1943 on, three fighter squadrons, the GC 3/6 Roussillon, GC 1/4 Navarre and GC 1/5 Champagne, flew these P-39s in combat over the Mediterranean, Italy and Southern France. A batch of P-39Qs was delivered later, but Airacobras, which were never popular with French pilots, had been replaced by P-47s in front line units by late 1944.

Italy

In June 1944, the Italian Co-Belligerent Air Force (ICAF) received 170 P-39s, most of them -Qs, and a few -Ns (15th USAAF surplus aircraft stored in Napoli-Capodichino airfield) and also at least one -L and five -Ms. The P-39 N (without the underwing fairings for .50 caliber machine guns) had engines with about 200 hours; a little newer than the P-39Q engines with 30–150 hours. A total of 149 P-39s would be used: the P-39N for training, while newer Qs were used in the front line.

In June–July 1944, Gruppi 12°, 9° and 10° of 4° Stormo, moved to Campo Vesuvio airstrip to re-equip with the P-39s. The site was not suitable and, in three months of training, 11 accidents occurred, due to engine failures and poor maintenance of the base. Three pilots died and two were seriously injured. One of the victims, on 25 August 1944, was the "ace of aces", Sergente Maggiore Teresio Vittorio Martinoli.

The three groups of 4° Stormo were first sent to Leverano (Lecce) airstrip, then in mid-October, to Galatina airfield. At the end of the training, eight more accidents occurred.  Almost 70 aircraft were operational, and on 18 September 1944, 12° Group's P-39s flew their first mission over Albania. Concentrating on ground attack, the Italian P-39s proved to be suitable in this role, losing 10 aircraft  between 4 November and 3 December 1944, to German flak. 
In February–March 1945, 10° and 9° Gruppi moved North of Galatina, in Canne airbase, near Campobasso, while Allied allowed Italian pilots to use the airstrip of Lissa island, in the Adriatic sea, as an intermediate scale during the long sorties on the Balkans. The 4° Stormo pilots flew many effective ground attack missions on northern Yugoslavia, losing only one more P-39, for engine failure in Sarajevo area, on 2 April 1945.  The Italian P-39 flew over 3,000 hours of combat.

By the end of the war, 89 P-39s were still at the Canne airport and 13 at the Scuola Addestramento Bombardamento e Caccia ("Training School for Bombers and Fighters") at Frosinone airfield. In 10 months of operational service, the 4° Stormo  had been awarded three Medaglia d'Oro al Valore Militare "alla memoria". After the war the P-39s were taken over by the Aeronautica Militare Italiana (the new Italian air force) and used for several years as training aircraft. In Galatina fighter training unit  (Scuola Caccia), war veteran Tenente colonnello Francis Leoncini was killed during a flying accident, on 10 May 1950.

Portugal
Between December 1942 and February 1943, the Aeronáutica Militar (Army Military Aviation) obtained aircraft operated by the 81st and the 350th Fighter Groups originally dispatched to North Africa as part of Operation Torch. Due to several problems en route, some of the aircraft were forced to land in Portugal and Spain. Of the 19 fighter aircraft that landed in Portugal, all were interned and entered service that year with the Portuguese Army Military Aviation. They formed the Squadron OK, based at Ota Air Base.

Though unnecessary, the Portuguese Government paid the United States US$20,000 for each of these interned aircraft as well as for one interned Lockheed P-38 Lightning. The U.S. accepted the payment, and gave as a gift four additional crates of aircraft, two of which were not badly damaged, without supplying spares, flight manuals or service manuals. Without proper training, incorporation of the aircraft into service was plagued with problems, and the last six Portuguese Airacobras that remained in 1950 were sold for scrap.

Post-war use
A very small number of late-production P-39Qs survived long enough in the USAAF inventory to be acquired by the United States Air Force upon its separation from the Army. These aircraft served in training and testing roles for approximately a year.  They were redesignated as ZF-39Qs ("ZF" for "Obsolete Fighter") in June 1948 as part of the new aircraft designation scheme throughout the USAF.

In 1945, Italy purchased the 46 surviving P-39s at 1% of their cost but in summer 1946 many accidents occurred, including fatal ones. By 1947, 4° Stormo  re-equipped with P-38s, with P-39s sent to training units until the type's retirement in 1951. Only a T9 cannon survives today at Vigna di Valle Museum.

Racing

The Airacobra was raced at the National Air Races in the United States after World War II. Famous versions used for racing included the twin aircraft known as "Cobra I" and "Cobra II," owned jointly by Bell Aircraft test pilots Tex Johnston and Jack Woolams. These aircraft were powered by an extensively modified 2000-horsepower engine, and a P-63 four-blade propeller. "Cobra I" with its pilot, Jack Woolams, was lost in 1946 during a test flight over Lake Ontario. The "Cobra II" flown by test pilot "Tex" Johnston, beat racing-modified P-51s, as well as other P-39 racers (which were the favorites), to win the 1946 Thompson Trophy race.

Cobra II competed again in the 1947 Thompson Trophy, finishing 3rd. In the 1948 Thompson trophy, she was unable to finish due to engine difficulties. Cobra II did not race again and was destroyed on 10 August 1968 during a test flight prior to an attempt at the world piston-engine air speed record, when owner-pilot Mike Carroll lost control and crashed. Carroll died and the highly modified P-39 was destroyed.

Mira Slovak's P-39Q "Mr. Mennen" (Race #21) was a fast unlimited racer, but a late arrival in 1972 kept the  racer out of the Reno races, and she was never entered again. Her color scheme was all white with "Mennen" green and bronze trim. She is now owned and displayed by the Kalamazoo Air Zoo, in the color scheme of P-400 "Whistlin' Britches."

Variants

XP-39
Bell Model 11, one prototype 38–326 first flown 6 April 1938 or 1939. Powered by a  Allison V-1710-17 (E2) engine and was fitted with a General Electric B-5 turbosupercharger, creating a two stage supercharging system similar to the P-38 (engine-mounted mechanical supercharger, remote exhaust-driven turbo-supercharger as a second stage for high-altitude). Aircraft remained unarmed. Later converted to XP-39B.

XP-39B
One conversion first flown 25 November 1939. The turbosupercharger was removed, and the single-stage, single speed, supercharged  Allison V-1710-37 (E5) engine remained. The carburetor air intake was moved behind the canopy.

YP-39
Bell Model 12, service test version,  V-1710-37 (E5) engine. Armed with an M4 37 mm cannon with 15 rounds, 2 × .50 caliber machine guns with 200 rpg, and 2 × .30 caliber machine guns with 500 rpg in the nose. Wider vertical tail than XP-39B. 13 completed with the first flying on 13 September 1940.

YP-39A
One intended to have a V-1710-31 engine, but was delivered as a regular YP-39.

P-39C
Bell Model 13, initial US Army designation P-45 Airacobra. First flown in January 1941, it was the first production version, identical to YP-39 except for  V-1710-35 engine. Armed with 1 × 37 mm cannon, 2 × .50 caliber and 2 × .30 caliber machine guns in the nose. Aircraft lacked armor and self-sealing fuel tanks. Twenty were produced out of an order of 80, with the remainder completed as P-39Ds.

P-39D
Bell Model 15, production variant based on the P-39C with additional armor and self-sealing fuel tanks. Armament increased to 1 × 37 mm cannon with 30 rounds, 2 × .50 caliber and 4 × wing mounted .30 caliber machine guns; 429 produced.

P-39D-1
Bell Model 14A, production variant fitted with a 20 mm M1 cannon instead of 37 mm cannon. Specifically ordered for delivery under Lend-Lease. 336 produced.

P-39D-2
Bell Model 14A-1, production variant again intended for lend lease and fitted with 20 mm cannon, but with  V-1710-63 (E6) engine. 158 produced.

P-39D-3
26 conversions from P-39D-1 to photo reconnaissance configuration; K-24 and K-25 camera in rear fuselage, extra armor for oil coolers.

P-39D-4
11 conversions from P-39D-2 to photo reconnaissance configuration. Same modifications as D-3 aircraft.

XP-39E
Bell Model 23. three P-39Ds modified for ground and flight testing first flown 21 February 1942. Intended for  Continental I-1430-1 engine but only flown with 1325 hp Allison V-1710-47 engine. Used to test various wing and vertical tails. The production variant, with the Continental engines was to be designated P-76; there was no Bell XP-76 as such.

P-39F
Bell Model 15B, production variant with three-bladed Aeroproducts constant speed propeller. 229 built.

P-39F-2
27 conversions from P-39F for ground attack and tactical reconnaissance.

P-39G
Bell Model 26, 1800 ordered, intended to be a P-39D-2 with a different propeller. Later cancelled, with aircraft delivered as P-39K, L, M and N.

P-39J
Bell Model 15B, P-39F with  V-1710-59 engine with automatic boost control; 25 built.

P-39K
P-39K-1
Bell Model 26A. Fitted with an Aeroproducts propeller and powered by a  V-1710-63 (E6) engine. 210 built. 

P-39K-2
Six conversion from P-39K-1  for ground attack and reconnaissance.

P-39K-5
One conversion with a V-1710-85 (E19) engine to serve as a P-39N prototype.

P-39L
P-39L-1
Bell Model 26B, similar to P-39K with Curtiss Electric propeller and higher gross weight. 250 built.

P-39L-2
Eleven conversions from P-39L-1 for ground attack and reconnaissance.
P-39M
P-39M-1
P-39M-2
 Modification of P-39M-1 for ground attack/
P-39N
Bell Model 26N, originally part of the P-39G order. 1325 hp V-1710-85 (E19) engine. Aeroproducts propeller and different reduction gear ratio.
P-39N-1
Variant with internal changes to adjust center of gravity when nose guns were fired; 900 built.

P-39N-2
128 P-39N-1 converted with additional belly armor and cameras in rear fuselage.

P-39N-3B
35 P-39N converted with additional belly armor and cameras in rear fuselage.

P-39N-5

P-39N-6
84 P-39N-5 converted with additional belly armor and cameras in rear fuselage.

P-39Q
The final production variant last one built in August 1944.

P-39Q-1
Bell Model 26Q, variant with wing-mounted .30 caliber machine guns replaced with a .50 caliber with 300 rounds of ammunition in a pod under each wing.

P-39Q-2
Five P-39Q-1s modified to carry cameras for photographic reconnaissance by adding K-24 and K-25 cameras in the aft fuselage.

P-39Q-5
Production variant with reduced armor, fuel capacity increased. Type A-1 bombsight adapters added; 950 built.

TP-39Q-5
One conversion to a two-seat training variant with additional cockpit added in nose – no armament. Enlarged tail fillet and a shallow ventral fin added.

P-39Q-6
148 P-39Q-5s modified to carry cameras for photographic reconnaissance by adding K-24 and K-25 cameras in the aft fuselage.

P-39Q-10
Variant with increased armor, fuel capacity increased. Automatic Boost controls added and throttle and RPM controls coordinated.  Winterization of oil systems and rubber mounts added to the engines; 705 built.

P-39Q-11
Eight P-39Q-10s modified to carry cameras for photographic reconnaissance by adding K-24 and K-25 cameras in the aft fuselage.

P-39Q-15
Production variant with reinforced inclined deck to prevent .50 caliber machine gun mounting cracking, bulkhead reinforcements to prevent rudder pedal wall cracking, a reinforced reduction gearbox bulkhead to prevent cowling former cracking, and repositioning of the battery solenoid. Oxygen system reduced from four bottle to two; 1,000 built.

P-39Q-20
Production variant with minor equipment changes. The under-wing .50 caliber machine gun pods sometimes omitted; 1,000 built.

P-39Q-21
109 P-39Q-20 fitted with a four-bladed Aeroproducts propeller.

RP-39Q-22
12 P-39Q-20s converted to two-seat trainers .

P-39Q-25
Production variant similar to the P-39Q-21 but with a reinforced aft-fuselage and horizontal stabilizer structure; 700 built.

P-39Q-30
Production variant that reverted to the three-bladed propeller; 400 built.

ZF-39
Remaining examples in service, re-designated in June 1948.

P-45
The P-45 was the initial designation of the P-39C or Model 13.

XFL-1 Airabonita
One prototype tail-wheel undercarriage carrier fighter for the USN.

XTDL-1
United States Navy (USN) designation for two P-39Qs used as target drones. Assigned to NAS Cape May for test work. Later redesignated F2L-1K.

F2L-1K
XTDL-1 drones re-designated

P-400
An export model of the P-39 with a less powerful cannon, using a 20 mm Hispano cannon rather than the standard 37 mm cannon. It also had 2 .50 caliber machine guns in the nose, and 2 x .30 caliber machine guns in each wing.
 
Airacobra I
Bell Model 13, Royal Air Force (RAF) designation for three P-39Cs delivered to the A&AEE Boscombe Down for testing.

Airacobra IA
Bell Model 14. Briefly named Caribou. 1,150 hp V-1710-E4 engine, 1 × 20 mm cannon with 60 rounds and 2 × .50 caliber machine guns mounted in the nose and four .303 caliber machine guns were mounted in the wings. IFF set removed from behind pilot. note: the designation IA indicates direct purchase aircraft (as opposed to Lend-Lease); 675 built. The USAAF operated 128 former RAF aircraft with the designation P-400.

Operators

 Royal Australian Air Force

 Armée de l'Air

 Italian Co-Belligerent Air Force operated 170 Bell P-39 Airacobra 

 Italian Air Force operated 102 surviving Bell P-39 Airacobra retired in 1950s

 Polish Air Force (One aircraft operated; personal aircraft of General Fyodor Polynin, Commander of the Polish Air Force)

 Esquadrilha Airacobra (Airacobra Squadron), later renamed Esquadrilha 4 (Squadron No. 4) — Aeronáutica Militar (Army Military Aviation)

 Soviet Air Forces (Voyenno-Vozdushnye Sily or VVS)
 Soviet Naval Aviation

 Royal Air Force
 Royal Navy (Airacobra Mk 1 – test flight)

 United States Army Air Corps / United States Army Air Forces

Surviving aircraft

Australia
On display
P-39D
41-6951 – Beck Military Collection in Mareeba, Queensland.

Canada
Under restoration or in storage
P-39M
42-4725 – Under restoration at the Alberta Aviation Museum in Edmonton Alberta.

Finland
P-39Q
44-2664 – Aviation Museum of Central Finland in Tikkakoski.

Papua New Guinea
P-39N
42-19039 – J. K. McCarthy Museum in Goroka, Papua New Guinea.

Russia
On display
P-39
220613 – House of Culture.

United States
Airworthy
P-39F
41-7215 (unnamed) – Military Aviation Museum in Virginia Beach, Virginia.  Was restored by Pioneer Aero Ltd at Ardmore, Auckland, for Jerry Yagen. MSN 15-554 was forced to land near Weipa, Queensland, on May 1, 1942, after running out of fuel. The aircraft remained abandoned at the site until recovery operations began in November 1971. First flight at Ardmore by Frank Parker on 26 February 2019. Painted in USAAF colors as P-39Q-5-BE 42-20341 (Lend Lease to USSR) and now relocated to and flying with the Fighter Factory/MAM as of May 2019.
P-39N
42-8740 (unnamed) – Yanks Air Museum in Chino, California.
P-39Q
42-19597 Miss Connie – Commemorative Air Force (CenTex Wing) in San Marcos, Texas.
42-19993 Brooklyn Bum – Lewis Air Legends in San Antonio, Texas.
On display
P-39N
42-18814 Girlie – recovered from Tadji New Guinea in 1972 by MARC Pima Air & Space Museum, adjacent to Davis-Monthan AFB in Tucson, Arizona.
42-18408 Snooks 2nd / Betty Lou 3rd – Buffalo and Erie County Naval & Military Park in Buffalo, New York.
P-39Q
42-20000 (unnamed) – March Field Air Museum at March ARB (former March AFB) in Riverside, California.
42-20007 (unnamed) – Virginia Air & Space Center near Langley AFB in Hampton, Virginia.
44-2485 (unnamed) – Erickson Aircraft Collection in Madras, Oregon.
RP-39Q

44-3887 (unnamed) – National Museum of the United States Air Force at Wright-Patterson AFB in Dayton, Ohio.
44-3908 Whistlin Britches – Air Zoo in Kalamazoo, Michigan.
Under restoration or in storage
P-39N
42-19027 Small Fry/Little Sir Echo –  under restoration for static display at Planes of Fame in Chino, California.
P-39Q 
44-2433 Galloping Gertie –  in storage at the Paul Garber Facility of the National Air and Space Museum in Silver Hill, Maryland.
44-2911 Miss Lend Lease – under restoration at the Niagara Aerospace Museum in Niagara Falls, New York. This plane was recovered from a Russian lake after disappearing during a routine mission during WWII. The pilot's remains were recovered and buried with full military honors. The aircraft crashed due to engine failure, as two holes were found inside the engine block from snapped connecting rods.

Specifications (P-39Q)

See also

References

Notes

Citations

Bibliography
 AAHS Journal, American Aviation Historical Society, Volume 46, 2001.
 Angelucci, Enzo and Paolo Matricardi. World Aircraft: World War II, Volume II (Sampson Low Guides). Maidenhead, UK: Sampson Low, 1978. .
 Angelucci, Enzo and Peter M. Bowers. The American Fighter: The Definitive Guide to American Fighter Aircraft from 1917 to the Present. New York, Orion Books, 1987. .
 Bergström, Christer. Bagration to Berlin – The final Air Battle in the East 1944–45. Hersham, UK: Classic Publications, 2008. .
 Bodie, Warren. The Lockheed P-38 Lightning. St. Paul, Minnesota: Widewing Publications, 1991. .
 Bowers, Peter M. "Airborne Cobra Pt. I". Airpower, Vol. 8, No. 6, November 1978.
 Bowers, Peter M. "Airborne Cobra Pt. II". Airpower, Vol.9, No. 1, January 1979.
 Brown, Captain Eric. Wings on My Sleeve. London: Weidenfeld & Nicolson, 2006. .
 Byk, Gary. The Modeller's Guide to the Bell P-39 Airacobra in RAAF Service. Melbourne, Australia: Red Roo Models Publication, 1997. .
 Dean, Francis H. America's Hundred Thousand. Atglen, Pennsylvania: Schiffer Publishing Ltd, 1997. .
 Dial, Jay Frank. The Bell P-39 Airacobra, Aircraft in Profile no.165. Windsor, Berkshire, UK: Profile Publications. Ltd., 1966 (reprinted 1971). No ISBN.
 "Dimensione Cielo aerei Italiani nella Seconda Guerra Mondiale. (in Italian) Caccia Assalto 3. Rome: Edizioni Bizzarri, 1972.
 Donald, David. "Bell P-39 Airacobra." The Encyclopedia of World Aircraft. Leicester, UK: Blitz Editions, 1997. .
 Dorr, Robert F. "Bell Cobra Variants: Bell P-39 Airacobra and P-63 Kingcobra". Wings of Fame, Volume 10, 1998. London: Aerospace Publishing. pp. 116–143. . . 
 Dorr, Robert F. and Jerry C. Scutts. Bell P-39 Airacobra. Ramsbury, Marlborough, Wiltshire, UK: The Crowood Press Ltd., 2000. .
 Drabkin, Artem. The Red Air Force at War: Barbarossa and the Retreat to Moscow – Recollections of Fighter Pilots on the Eastern Front. Barnsley, South Yorkshire, UK: Pen & Sword Military, 2007. .
 Fitzsimons, Bernard, editor. "Airacobra, Bell P-39". The Illustrated Encyclopedia of 20th Century Weapons and Warfare, Volume 1. New York: Columbia House, 1977. .
 Green, William. War Planes of the Second World War, Volume 4. London: Macdonald & Co., 6th Edition, 1969. .
 Green, William and Gordon Swanborough. WW2 Aircraft Fact Files:  U. S. Army Air Force Fighters, Part 1. London: Macdonald and Jane's, 1977. .
 Gueli, Marco. "Gli Airacobra Italiani" (in Italian). Storia Militare n.132, September 2004.
 Gunston, Bill. Aircraft of World War 2. London: Octopus Books Limited, 1980. .
 Hardesty, Von. Red Phoenix: The Rise of Soviet Air Power 1941–1945. Washington, D.C.: Smithsonian Institution, 1991 (first edition 1982). .
 Hoover, R.A. and Mark Shaw. Forever Flying. New York: Pocket Books, 1996. .
 Johnsen, Frederick A. Bell P-39/P-63 Airacobra & Kingcobra. St. Paul, Minnesota: Voyageur Press, 1998. .
 Johnson, Brian and Terry Heffernan. A Most Secret Place: Boscombe Down 1939–45. London: Jane's Publishing Company Limited, 1982. 
 Juszczak, Artur and Robert Pęczkowski. Bell P-39 Airacobra (in Polish). Sandomierz, Poland/Redbourn, UK: Mushroom Model Publications, 2003. .
Kelsey, Benjamin S. The Dragon's Teeth?: The Creation of United States Air Power for World War II. Washington, D.C.: Smithsonian Institution Press, 1982. .
 Kinzey, Bert. P-39 Airacobra in Detail, D&S Vol. 63. Carrollton, Texas: Squadron/Signal Publications, Inc., 1999. .

 Lednicer, David A. "Aerodynamics of the Bell P-39 Airacobra and P-63 Kingcobra." SAE paper 2000-01-167. Warrendale, Pennsylvania: SAE International, 9 May 2000.

 Loza, Dmitriy and James F. Gebhardt, editor and translator. Attack of the Airacobras: Soviet Aces, American P-39s & the Air War Against Germany. Lawrence, Kansas: University Press of Kansas, 2002. .
 Mariinskiy, Evgeniy. Red Star Airacobra: Memoirs of a Soviet Fighter Ace 1941–45. Solihull, UK: Helion and Company, 2006. .
 Mason, Francis K. Royal Air Force Fighters of World War Two, Volume One. Garden City, New York: Doubleday & Company Inc., 1971. .
 Matthews, Birch. Cobra! Bell Aircraft Corporation 1934–1946. Atglen, Pennsylvania: Schiffer Publishing, 1996. .
 Mattioli, Marco. Bell P-39 Airacobra in Italian Service, Aviolibri Special 7 (Bilingual Italian/English). Rome: IBN Editore, 2003. .
 McDowell, Ernest. P-39 Airacobra in Action, Aircraft No.43. Carrollton, Texas: Squadron/Signal Publications, Inc., 1980. .
 Mellinger, George and John Stanaway. P-39 Airacobra Aces of World War 2. Botley, Oxford, UK: Osprey Publishing, 2001. .
 Mitchell, Rick. Airacobra Advantage: The Flying Cannon. The Complete Story of Bell Aircraft Corporation's P-39 Pursuit Fighter Plane. Missoula, Montana: Pictorial Histories Publishing Co., 1992 (second printing 1995). .
 Morgan, Hugh. Gli assi Sovietici della Seconda guerra mondiale (in Italian). Rome: Edizioni del Prado/Osprey Aviation, 1999. 
 Park, Edwards. Nanette, Her Pilot's Love Story. Washington, D.C.: Smithsonian Institution Press, 1977. (2nd edition 1989). .
 Pearcy, Arthur. Flying the Frontiers: NACA and NASA Experimental Aircraft. Annapolis, Maryland: Naval Institute Press, 1993. .
 Pejčoch, Ivo. Bojové Legendy: P-39 Airacobra (in Czech). Prague, Czech Republic: Jan Vašut s.r.o., 2008. .
 Pelletier, A. J. Bell Aircraft since 1935. Annapolis, Maryland, USA: Naval Institute Press, 1992. .
 Roman, Valerij. Aerokobry vstupayut v boy ('Airacobras enter combat'), Белл P-400, P-39D-1, P-39D-2 ("Avia-retro" series 1) (in Ukrainian). Kiev, Ukraine: Aero-Hobby, 1993. .
 Roman, Valerij. Aerokobry nad Kuban'yu (Airacobras over Kuban'), P-39 K, L и M ("Avia-retro" series 2) (in Ukrainian). Kiev, Ukraine: Aero-Hobby, 2006. .
 Tomalik, Jacek. Bell P-39 Airacobra Cz.1, Monografie Lotnicze 58 (in Polish). Gdańsk, Poland: AJ-Press, 1999. .
 Tomalik, Jacek. Bell P-63 Kingcobra, XFL-1 Airabonita, P-39 Airacobra Cz.2, Monografie Lotnicze 59 (in Polish). Gdańsk, Poland: AJ-Press, 2001. .
 United States Air Force Museum Guidebook. Wright-Patterson AFB, Ohio: Air Force Museum Foundation, 1975.
 Williams, Neil. Aerobatics. New York: St. Martin's Press, 1975. .
 Wixey, Ken. "Flying Cannon: Bell's Cobra Family, Part One". Air Enthusiast, No. 80, May–June 1999, pp. 20–27. 
 Woods, Robert J. "Why a Rear Engine Installation," Parts I and II. Aviation, March and April 1941.

Further reading
 Vernon, Jerry. "Round-Out: Canadian 'Cobras". Air Enthusiast, No. 82, July–August 1999, pp. 76–77.

External links

 
 Australian War Memorial, US 5th Airforce gun camera footage, 1943. Includes P-39 gun camera footage (from the 1:03 mark). Lt Robert Adler (41st FS, USAAF) downing twin-engine Japanese bombers near Tsili Tsili, New Guinea, in 1943.

P-39
Single-engined tractor aircraft
Mid-engined aircraft
Bell P-39
Aircraft first flown in 1938